Standings and results for Group 9 of the UEFA Euro 2004 qualifying tournament.

Group 9 consisted of Azerbaijan, Finland, Italy, Serbia and Montenegro and Wales. Serbia and Montenegro began the campaign as the FR Yugoslavia, but officially changed their name in February 2003. Group winners were Italy, who finished four points clear of second-placed team Wales who qualified for the play-offs.

Standings

Matches

Goalscorers

References
RSSSF Page

Group 9
2002–03 in Italian football
Qual
2002–03 in Welsh football
2003–04 in Welsh football
2002–03 in Azerbaijani football
2003–04 in Azerbaijani football
2002–03 in Serbian football
2003–04 in Serbian football
2002–03 in Montenegrin football
2003–04 in Montenegrin football
2002 in Finnish football
2003 in Finnish football